Pattani is a town (thesaban mueang) in the far south of Thailand, near the border with Malaysia. It is the capital of Pattani Province. The city has a population of 44,353 (2018). It covers the whole tambon Sabarang, Anoru and Chabang Tiko of Mueang Pattani district.

Pattani lies 1,056 km south of Bangkok, and is located at the mouth of the Pattani River. The historic centre of Pattani was originally located a few miles away near the Krue Se Mosque, but developed at the present location after the older Patani was captured and sacked in 1785.

The local dialect of Malay is called Patani Malay or Yawi in Thai (derived from Jawi).

Etymology
Some believe that the name Pattani  originated from Malay name Patani (Jawi: ڤطاني), which can mean "this beach" in Patani Malay language. (In standard Malay, this would be pantai ini.) According to a legend, the founder of Patani was a raja from Kota Malikha named Phaya Tunakpa. Phaya Tunakpa went hunting one day and saw a beautiful albino mouse-deer the size of a goat, which then disappeared. He asked his men where the animal had gone, and they replied: "Pata ning lah!" ("This beach!" in the Patani Malay language). They searched for the mouse-deer but found instead an old couple, where the old man identified himself as Che' Tani ("Mister Tani"). The old man said that he was sent by the raja's grandfather to build a new town further beyond but had fallen ill on the journey; as he could not go any further, he stayed at that place. The raja then ordered a town be built at the site where the mouse-deer had disappeared. The town became Patani, which is believed to be named either after "this beach" where the mouse-deer had disappeared. Alternatively, it has also been said to be named after the old man as Pak Tani meaning "Father Tani".

Some also say the word Pattani is derived from "Petani" in Malay which means "farmer".  Another suggestion is that it derives from a Sanskrit word pathini, meaning "virgin nymph"; Pathini is also said to be the title of a daughter of Merong Mahawangsa, founder of the preceding kingdom of Langkasuka.

History
Patani is located at the mouth of the Pattani River. The river may have changed course and empty into the sea at the current location in the 16th century. A small port existed in the current location at Kuala Bekah at the mouth of Sungai Patani by the early 17th century. However, the older historical centre of the Pattani Kingdom that ruled over the region of Patani was located a 6–7 km to the east of the present city; near Ban Kru Se or Kampong Kersik, which is where the Krue Se Mosque is located.  The older Patani was captured and sacked by the Siamese, and a new town centre later developed in the current location and the Sultan moved to Cabang Tiga at the southern side of present-day Pattani in the 19th century. The Patani City municipality was established in 1935 by royal decree.

Climate
Pattani has a tropical monsoon climate according to the Köppen climate classification, with a lengthy wet season and a brief dry season. The temperatures and humidity are high year round, with slightly higher temperatures in April, just as the monsoon arrives. The wet season is long, lasting May-December, and the dry season short, covering only January-April. The months of October, November, and December are particularly wet.

References

External links

Populated places in Pattani province
Cities and towns in Thailand